Maragall is a station serving line 4 and line 5 of the Barcelona Metro.

The line 5 station was opened in  under Passeig Maragall, between Carrer Varsòvia and Carrer Mascaró. The curved central platform has a ticket hall at either end, the southern one giving access to the line 4 station. The station has a total of 3 accesses: Ramón Albó and Av. Borbó for line 5, Rda. Guinardó for line 4.

Services

External links

 Maragall at Trenscat.com

Railway stations in Spain opened in 1982
Barcelona Metro line 4 stations
Barcelona Metro line 5 stations
Railway stations in Spain opened in 1959
Transport in Horta-Guinardó